Brúnastaðir is a farm in southern Iceland, located in the municipality of Flóahreppur.

Brúnastaðir is the birthplace of two politicians, August Þorvaldsson and his son Guðni Ágústsson, Progressive Party MPs.

References

Populated places in Southern Region (Iceland)